Daniel Tsai (born 1956 or 1957) is a Taiwanese billionaire businessman. He and his brother Richard Tsai run Fubon Financial Holding Co., founded by their father Tsai Wan-tsai. As of April 2022, his net worth was estimated at US$4.9 billion.

Tsai resides in Taipei, Taiwan. He is married and has four children.

References

Taiwanese billionaires
21st-century Taiwanese businesspeople
1950s births
Living people
Year of birth missing (living people)
Place of birth missing (living people)
Tsai family of Miaoli
Georgetown University alumni
National Taiwan University alumni